Subcarpathian may refer to:

 someone or something related to geographical region of Outer Subcarpathia
 Subcarpathian Voivodship, an administrative region in modern Poland
 Subcarpathian Regional Assembly, a regional assembly of the Subcarpathian Voivodship (Poland)
 Subcarpathian constituency (European Parliament), an EP electoral constituency in Poland
 Prykarpattia, a section of outer-subcarpathian region in modern Ukraine
 Bukovinian Subcarpathia, a section of outer-subcarpathians in the region of Bukovina
 Moldavian Subcarpathia, a section of outer-subcarpathians in the region of Moldavia

 someone or something related to geographical region of Inner Subcarpathia
 Subcarpathian Rus', an historical and geographical region
 Region of Subcarpathia (1919-1938), an administrative region of the First Czechoslovak Republic
 Autonomous Subcarpathian Rus' (1938-1939), an autonomous region of the Second Czechoslovak Republic
 Social Democratic Workers' Party in Subcarpathian Rus', a former regional political party
 International Socialist Party of Subcarpathian Rus', a former regional political party
 Subcarpathian Reformed Church, a Christian denomination

See also
 Subcarpathia (disambiguation)
 Carpathia (disambiguation)
 Carpathian (disambiguation)
 Ciscarpathian (disambiguation)
 Transcarpathia (disambiguation)
 Zakarpattia (disambiguation)